Hüllhorst is a municipality in the Minden-Lübbecke district, in North Rhine-Westphalia, Germany.

Geography
Hüllhorst is situated on the south side of the Wiehengebirge, approx. 5 km south-east of Lübbecke and 20 km west of Minden.

Neighbouring places
 Lübbecke
 Preußisch Oldendorf
 Hille
 Bad Oeynhausen
 Löhne
 Kirchlengern
Rödinghausen

Subdivisions of the municipality
Hüllhorst consists of 9 districts (Population as of December 31, 2006):
 Ahlsen-Reineberg (1,009 inhabitants)
 Bröderhausen (687 inhabitants)
 Büttendorf (794 inhabitants)
 Holsen (1,080 inhabitants)
 Huchzen (45 inhabitants)
 Hüllhorst (2,761 inhabitants)
 Oberbauerschaft (2,998 inhabitants)
 Schnathorst (2,850 inhabitants)
 Tengern (2,038 inhabitants)

See also

 Hüllhorst Comprehensive School

References

External links
 
 Official site 

Minden-Lübbecke
Wiehen Hills